The IL10 family is a family of interleukins.

In addition to IL-10, it includes IL-19, IL-20, IL-22, IL-24 and IL-26.

Some sources also include the interferons IL-28 and IL-29.

The IL-10 family are helical cytokines categorized based on their specific similarities and can be classified as class 2 cytokines.

IL-10 Family

Biological activity 
IL-10 family - is one of the important types of cytokines, that can stop the inflammation. In general. these cytokines have a helical structure of homodimers. The difference that the members of IL-10 family have between each other is that they have various receptor-binding residues, which help with interaction with specific cytokine receptors. The features of the IL-10 family consists of their genomic structure being similar, their primary and secondary protein structures being similar, their a clustering of encoding genes, and their utilization the similar receptor complexes.

IL-10 
Interleukin 10 is produced by regulatory T lymphocytes, B cells, and monocytes. It is a homodimer that functions through the IL-10R1 and IL-10R2 receptor complexes, activating such kinases as Janus kinase and tyrosine kinase 2. IL-10R2 receptor is presented in most cells, when IL-10R1 receptor is IL-10 is also an inhibitor of expressions of CD80 and CD86 by dendritic cells (DC) and antigen-presenting cells (APC), and of T cells, decreasing their cytokine production, therefore, controlling their activation. IL-10 plays a big role in regulating allergies by inhibiting cytokines responsible for allergic inflammation.

IL-19 
Interleukin 19 is produced mainly in monocytes, and can be found in big concentrations in patients with allergic disorders and psoriasis. IL-19 plays a big role in the CNS by regulating the inflammation process through a delayed production of it.

IL-20 
IL-20 - induces cheratin proliferation and Stat-3 signal transduction pathway; is expressed in the CNS, myeloid cells, and keratinocytes.  When IL-20 is inhibited in the CNS can stop such inflammations as acute ischemic brain injury.

IL-22 
IL-22 mediates inflammation and binds class II cytokine receptor heterodimers IL-22 RA1/CRF2-4; is involved in immuno-regulatory responses

IL-24 
IL-24 produced by activated monocytes and T-cells.

IL-26 
IL-26 is a newly discovered cytokine produced by memory T cells and monocytes. IL-26 assist with the process of human T cell transformation after their infections.

Three Subgroups of IL-10 family 
Based on the functions of the cytokine, the IL-10 family can be separated into three subfamily groups. IL-10 subfamily cytokine selects the innate and adaptive immune response and can prevents the function to reduce tissue damage. The IL-20 subfamily of cytokine works on tissues in the stroma and epithelial cells to bring out the mechanism of innate defense that manages the attack of extracellular pathogens. The IL-28 subfamily of cytokine are type III interferon (IFN) family. This subfamily share intersecting biology and signaling pathways with type I IFN family cytokines but the difference is that the type III INF family cytokines prefer to target the tissues of the epithelial cell.

References

Cytokines